Rémi Talès (born 2 May 1984) is a French rugby union player. His position is fly-half and he currently plays for Mont-de-Marsan in the Pro D2. He began his career with Stade Montois before moving to La Rochelle. He established himself as a key player at La Rochelle, helping them to promotion to the Top 14 in the 2009–10 season. After La Rochelle's relegation in 2011, he moved to Castres.

At Castres he captained them to victory in the 2012–13 Top 14 season, in the final of which he scored two important drop goals.

Honours

Club 
 Castres
Top 14: 2012–13

References

1984 births
Living people
French rugby union players
People from Mont-de-Marsan
Stade Montois players
Stade Rochelais players
Castres Olympique players
Racing 92 players
Rugby union fly-halves
Sportspeople from Landes (department)
France international rugby union players